Francisco Antonio Sarmiento de Luna y Enríquez, O.S.A. (1615 – 21 July 1683) was a Roman Catholic prelate who served as Bishop of Coria (1675–1683), Bishop of Almería (1673–1675), and Bishop of Michoacán (1668–1673).

Biography
Francisco Antonio Sarmiento de Luna y Enríquez was born in Seville, Spain in 1615 and ordained a priest in the Order of Saint Augustine .
On 12 November 1668, he was appointed during the papacy of Pope Clement IX as Bishop of Michoacán.
On 5 January 1670, he was consecrated bishop by Francisco Verdín y Molina, Bishop of Guadalajara.
On 25 September 1673, he was appointed during the papacy of Pope Clement X as Bishop of Almería.
On 27 May 1675, he was appointed during the papacy of Pope Clement X as Bishop of Coria.
He served as Bishop of Coria until his death on 21 July 1683.

While bishop, he was the principal consecrator of Martín de Espinosa y Monzón, Bishop of Comayagua (1673) and Antonio Ibarra, Bishop of Almería (1675).

References

External links and additional sources
 (for Chronology of Bishops) 
 (for Chronology of Bishops) 
 (for Chronology of Bishops) 
 (for Chronology of Bishops) 

17th-century Roman Catholic bishops in Mexico
Bishops appointed by Pope Clement IX
Bishops appointed by Pope Clement X
1615 births
1683 deaths